Michael Friedman (born April 2, 1947) is an American philosopher who serves as Professor of Philosophy and the Frederick P. Rehmus Family Professor of Humanities at Stanford University. Friedman is best known for his work in the philosophy of science, especially on scientific explanation and the philosophy of physics, and for his historical work on Immanuel Kant. Friedman has also done historical work on figures in continental philosophy such as Martin Heidegger and Ernst Cassirer. Friedman also serves as the co-director of the Program in History and Philosophy of Science and Technology at Stanford University.

Education and career
Friedman earned his BA from Queens College, City University of New York in 1969 and his PhD from Princeton University in 1973. He is the Frederick P. Rehmus Family Professor of Humanities at Stanford University. Before moving to Stanford in 2002, Friedman taught at Harvard University, the University of Pennsylvania, the University of Illinois at Chicago, Indiana University, and UC Berkeley as a visiting professor. 

Friedman has been a Fellow of the American Academy of Arts & Sciences since 1997. Four of his articles have been selected as among the "ten best" of their year by The Philosopher's Annual.

Philosophical work

Friedman's early work was on the nature of scientific explanation and the philosophy of physics.  His first book, Foundations of Space-Time Theories, was published by Princeton University Press in 1983 won the Matchette Prize (now known as the Book Prize) from the American Philosophical Association, to recognize work by a younger scholar.  It also won the Lakatos Award from the London School of Economics to recognize outstanding work in philosophy of science.

Kant and the Exact Sciences was described in Philosophical Review as "a very important book," "required reading for researchers on the relation between the exact sciences and Kant's philosophy."

UC Berkeley German philosophy professor Hans Sluga described Friedman's 2000 book A Parting of the Ways: Carnap, Cassirer, and Heidegger, a book that detailed the philosophies of Carnap, Cassirer, and Heidegger, as "eye-opening" and "ambitious".  The book shed new light on the split between analytic philosophy and Continental philosophy.

In his book Dynamics of Reason, Friedman "provides the fullest account to date not only of [his] neo-Kantian, historicized, dynamical conception of relativized a priori principles of mathematics and physics, but also of the pivotal role that [he] sees philosophy as playing in making scientific revolutions rational."

Friedman is an honorary professor at the University of Western Ontario.

Personal life 

Friedman is married to Graciela de Pierris, an associate professor of philosophy at Stanford who has published research on late modern philosophy.

Selected publications

Books 
Foundations of Space-Time Theories: Relativistic Physics and the Philosophy of Science (Princeton University Press, 1983)
Kant and the Exact Sciences (Harvard University Press, 1992)
Reconsidering Logical Positivism (Cambridge University Press, 1999)
A Parting of the Ways: Carnap, Cassirer, and Heidegger (Open Court, 2000)
Dynamics of Reason: The 1999 Kant Lectures at Stanford University (CSLI/University of Chicago Press, 2001)
Immanuel Kant: Metaphysical Foundations of Natural Science (Cambridge University Press, 2004) (editor)
The Kantian Legacy in Nineteenth-Century Science (MIT Press, 2006) (co-editor with Alfred Nordmann)
The Cambridge Companion to Carnap (2007) (co-editor with Richard Creath)
Kant's Construction of Nature:  A Reading of the Metaphysical Foundations of Natural Science (Cambridge University Press, 2013)

Journal articles

References

External links 
 Faculty profile at Stanford University

20th-century American philosophers
21st-century American philosophers
American philosophy academics
Philosophers of cosmology
Philosophers of science
Living people
1947 births
Fellows of the American Academy of Arts and Sciences
Lakatos Award winners